Alliance Investment Bank Malaysia Berhad (AIBB), a subsidiary of Alliance Bank Malaysia Berhad (ABMB), is an investment bank.

References

External links
Alliance Financial Group
Alliance Bank Malaysia Berhad

Investment banks in Malaysia